Jürgen Damm Rascón (born 7 November 1992) is a Mexican professional footballer who plays as a winger for Liga MX club América.

According to a study conducted by Mexican club Pachuca, and backed by FIFA, Damm was the second fastest player in the world on 2015. He was able to reach  running with the ball.

Early life
Jürgen Damm was born to an upper-middle-class family. His paternal grandfather is from Germany, and as a result, he holds a German passport. He was born in the coastal city of Tuxpan, state of Veracruz, and due to his father's job, 2-year-old Damm and his family moved to Toronto. After two years in Canada, Jürgen and his family returned to Mexico and settled in Guadalajara, where he began his football career. As his father always believed education was first, due to their family heritage, so Jürgen was not allowed to join any clubs until age 17, and he continues to pursue a degree in Business Administration.

Jürgen was spotted by Magdaleno Mercado and invited to a try out with Atlas. Damm spent 6 months with the team but left due to a lack of playing opportunities. He was then transferred to the youth team of Tecos under trainer Francisco Chavez.

Club career

Tecos
Damm began his professional career with Tecos at age 18. He made his debut in the Liga MX on 25 March 2012 in a 0–4 loss against Monterrey under coach Héctor Hugo Eugui. After his first season with Tecos, they were relegated to the Second Division where he remained for several seasons.

Pachuca
Damm completed a permanent transfer to Pachuca on 30 June 2013. During his first season with his new club, he appeared in every game and scored the first goal of his career against Guadalajara on 20 October 2013. In his second season with the club, Pachuca made it to the final of the Clausura 2014 season. He played in all of Pachuca's playoff matches, reaching the final against León, where Pachuca lost 3–4 on aggregate score.

Damm started off the 2014 Apertura season with an injury in the second match against Monterrey. After having missed 8 games he made a full comeback on 1 October 2014. Jürgen also participated in the 2014–15 CONCACAF Champions League with Pachuca scoring a goal against Municipal on 24 September 2014.

Tigres UANL
On 10 June 2015, Damm joined Tigres UANL in a reported $10 million deal. On 3 October 2015, he scored his first goal for Tigres in a 1–0 victory against Atlas.

At Tigres, Damm was a part of four Mexican championship teams winning the Liga MX Apertura in consecutive years from 2015 to 2017, while adding the Liga MX Clausura title in 2019. The midfielder was a mainstay for Tigres totaling 172 appearances in all competitions. He completed his Tigres career with 13 goals and 23 assists. Damm also played in 22 CONCACAF Champions League matches and made 4 appearances in the Copa Libertadores when Tigres was invited to the competition in 2015 and reached the final against River Plate.</ref>

Atlanta United 
On 1 July 2020, Damm joined Major League Soccer side Atlanta United after they paid $50,000 in General Allocation Money to Houston Dynamo who held his Discovery Rights.

On 25 February 2022, Atlanta United exercised an offseason Buyout of a Guaranteed Contract after 24 appearances for the club over two seasons.

América 
After a trial period during pre-season, on 18 June 2022, Damm officially joined Club América.

International career
On 18 March 2015, Damm received his first call up to the senior national team under coach Miguel Herrera for the friendlies against Ecuador on 28 March and Paraguay on 31 March. He made his senior debut on 28 March 2015 against Ecuador, coming in as a substitute in the 84th minute of the game.

On 17 November 2015, Damm scored his first international goal against Honduras in a 2–0 away win for Mexico.

In May 2018, Damm was named in Mexico's preliminary 28-man squad for the World Cup, but did not make the final 23.

Career statistics

Club

International

Scores and results list Mexico's goal tally first.

Honours
Tigres UANL
Liga MX: Apertura 2015, Apertura 2016, Apertura 2017, Clausura 2019
Campeón de Campeones: 2016, 2017, 2018
Campeones Cup: 2018

Individual
Liga MX Best XI: Apertura 2015

References

External links
 

1992 births
Living people
Footballers from Veracruz
Mexican people of German descent
German people of Mexican descent
Sportspeople of Mexican descent
Mexican expatriates in Canada
German expatriates in Canada
Association football wingers
Mexican footballers
German footballers
Mexico international footballers
2017 FIFA Confederations Cup players
Tecos F.C. footballers
C.F. Pachuca players
Tigres UANL footballers
Atlanta United FC players
Liga MX players
People from Tuxpan, Veracruz
Major League Soccer players